Adam Mark Burish (born January 6, 1983) is an American former professional ice hockey winger who played in the National Hockey League (NHL) with the Chicago Blackhawks, Dallas Stars and San Jose Sharks. He is currently an analyst covering Blackhawks games on NBC Sports Chicago.

Playing career
Burish was drafted in the 9th round of the 2002 NHL Entry Draft, 282nd overall by the Chicago Blackhawks.

Prior to his NHL career Burish, a Madison, Wisconsin native, played at the University of Wisconsin and graduated with a degree in Economics. He served as captain for the national champion 2005–06 team, and assisted on both goals (by Robbie Earl and Tom Gilbert) in Wisconsin's 2-1 victory over Boston College in the title game.

He recorded his first career NHL goal on January 22, 2008. Two seasons later, he won the Stanley Cup with the Chicago Blackhawks.

On July 1, 2010, Burish left the Blackhawks as a free agent and signed a two-year deal with the Dallas Stars at $1.15 million per year.

Upon expiration of his contract with the Stars, on July 1, 2012, Burish signed a four-year deal with the San Jose Sharks at $1.8 million per year, reuniting with University of Wisconsin teammate Joe Pavelski.

On October 17, 2013, Burish had surgery to repair an injured back and was placed on Injured Reserve.

In the 2014–15 season, on November 21, 2014, Burish was placed on waivers by the Sharks and was sent down to play with affiliate, the Worcester Sharks of the AHL. On January 14, 2015, the Chicago Wolves acquired Burish via loan. After concluding the season with the Wolves, on June 19, 2015, Burish was bought out from the final year of his contract with the Sharks, releasing him to free agency.

Unable to gain another NHL deal, Burish left North America as a free agent, signing his first contract abroad for the 2015–16 season, in playing with the Växjö Lakers and Malmö Redhawks of the Swedish Hockey League (SHL). He left the Redhawks in 2016 after playing in 3 games.

Media career
Burish joined NBC Sports Chicago in 2017 as an analyst for the Chicago Blackhawks. He provides commentary during pregame and postgame shows.

Personal
Burish has a younger sister, Nikki Burish, who also played for the University of Wisconsin.

Married to Jackie Burish on August 17, 2019.

Burish attended the Route 91 Harvest music festival on October 1, 2017, when a gunman opened fire on concertgoers. He survived the attack and was not injured.

Career statistics

Regular season and playoffs

International

Awards and honors

References

External links

1983 births
Living people
American men's ice hockey right wingers
American people of Greek descent
Chicago Blackhawks draft picks
Chicago Blackhawks players
Chicago Wolves players
Dallas Stars players
Green Bay Gamblers players
Sportspeople from Madison, Wisconsin
Ice hockey players from Wisconsin
Malmö Redhawks players
Norfolk Admirals players
San Jose Sharks players
Stanley Cup champions
Växjö Lakers players
Wisconsin Badgers men's ice hockey players
Worcester Sharks players